Božidar Orešković (21 August 1942 – 09 July 2010) was a Croatian actor. He appeared in more than fifty films from 1963 to 2010.

Selected filmography

References

External links 

1942 births
2010 deaths
Croatian male film actors
Male actors from Zagreb
Suicides by hanging in Croatia
2010 suicides
Burials at Miroševac Cemetery